Mayflower Productions was a British-based film production company of the 1930s and 1950s.

Mayflower Pictures
Mayflower Pictures was formed in July 1937 by German-born film producer Erich Pommer and British actor Charles Laughton. John Maxwell was on the board. They announced they would make three films, all to star Laughton – Vessel of Wrath (1938), St. Martin's Lane (1938) and Jamaica Inn (1939).

The films were all made. Jamaica Inn was the last film directed by Alfred Hitchcock before he left for America and marking the star debut of Maureen O'Hara, who was put under contract to the company.

In March 1939 Mayflower signed a contract with Paramount for the latter to distribute four of their films in the US. The fourth film would be a version of The Admirable Crichton with Laughton, Elsa Lanchester and O'Hara  There were also plans to make a movie about a journalist written by Bartlett Press.

However the disappointing financial performance of the films saw the company lose its main backer, John Maxwell.

Laughton went to America to appear in The Hunchback of Notre Dame and Pommer went with him to negotiate American distribution rights for the films; after this, war broke out, and as a German passport holder, Pommer was unable to return to England. O'Hara, Pommer and Laughton all went to work for RKO. For a time, The Admirable Crichton was still discussed but the film was never made. Neither was another proposed project, a biopic of Dr Samuel Johnson.

Mayflower Productions
The company was re-activated in the late 1940s as "Mayflower Productions", the company of Maxwell Setton and Aubrey Baring. It made seven films, mostly action stories, before the company was dissolved. The company initially borrowed money from Rank or ABPC. In December 1951 Setton arranged finance from the NFFC and the Treasury Capital Issue's Committee to finance South of Algiers provided he could get a distributor guarantee. This meant Setton only had to get a guarantee from a distributor, not actually money. Setton and Baring ultimately parted ways after a differing of opinion of what films to make. Setton set up Marksman Films.

Filmography

Mayflower Pictures
Vessel of Wrath (1938)
St. Martin's Lane (1938) AKA Sidewalks of London
Jamaica Inn (1939)

Mayflower Productions
The Spider and the Fly (1949)
Cairo Road (1950)
The Adventurers (1951) aka Fortune in Diamonds, The Great Adventure
So Little Time (1952)
Raiders in the Sky aka Appointment in London (1953)
South of Algiers aka The Golden Mask (1953)They Who Dare'' (1954)

References

External links
Mayflower Pictures at IMDb
Mayflower Productions at IMDb
Mayflower Pictures at BFI

Film production companies of the United Kingdom